The discography of American country music artist Martina McBride consists of 14 studio albums, one live album, eight compilation albums, two video albums, three additional albums, 45 music videos, 51 singles, 16 other charting songs, and 45 album appearances. In 1991, she signed a recording contract with RCA Nashville, launching her debut studio album The Time Has Come in 1992. In September 1993, her second studio album The Way That I Am was issued. Its lead single "My Baby Loves Me" reached number 2 on the Billboard Hot Country Songs chart, becoming her breakthrough hit. The third single "Independence Day" peaked in the Top 20 and became McBride's signature song. The song's success elevated sales of The Way That I Am to platinum status from the Recording Industry Association of America. Wild Angels was released in September 1995 and reached number seventeen on the Billboard Top Country Albums chart. The album's title track became McBride's first song to top the Hot Country Songs chart. McBride's fourth studio album Evolution was released in August 1997 and is her best-selling album to date, certifying three times platinum in the United States. The album spawned six singles which all became major hits including, "A Broken Wing", "Wrong Again", and "Whatever You Say". After releasing a holiday album, McBride's fifth studio album Emotion was issued in September 1999. The lead single "I Love You" topped the Hot Country Songs chart, while also reaching minor positions on the Adult Contemporary and Billboard Hot 100 charts.

In 2001, McBride released her first Greatest Hits project, becoming her first album to top the Top Country Albums chart. All four of the album's new tracks were single releases including the number one single "Blessed". Martina (2003) certified double platinum in the United States and featured the top 5 singles "This One's for the Girls" and "In My Daughter's Eyes". McBride's seventh studio album entitled Timeless (2005) contained a series of classic country songs, debuting atop the country albums chart and the top ten of the Billboard 200. In 2007, McBride returned with her eighth studio record entitled Waking Up Laughing, which debuted in the top five of the Billboard country albums chart and Billboard 200. The album featured original songwriting material by McBride herself, including "Anyway", the album's lead single. After recording a live album in 2008, McBride's next studio album entitled Shine (2009) was issued. The album spawned three singles that reached the Top 20 on the country songs chart. Switching to Republic Nashville, Eleven was released in October 2011. Debuting at number 4 on the country albums chart, the album's second single "I'm Gonna Love You Through It" became a major hit in 2012. Under the production of Don Was, McBride released her twelfth studio record Everlasting (2014) that featured covers of R&B songs. Since her debut, Martina McBride has sold over 14 million albums, according to the Recording Industry Association of America.

Albums

Studio albums

Live albums

Compilation albums

Other albums

Singles

As lead artist

As guest artist

Other charted songs

Videography

Video albums

Music videos

As lead artist

As guest artist

Other appearances

Notes

References

External links
 Official Website
 Martina McBride Full Discography at Discogs

Country music discographies
Martina McBride albums
Martina McBride songs
Discographies of American artists